

2000

Roster

Schedule

Tigers in the 2000 MLB Draft
The following members of the Missouri Tigers baseball program were drafted in the 2000 Major League Baseball Draft.

2001

Roster

Schedule

Tigers in the 2001 MLB Draft
The following members of the Missouri Tigers baseball program were drafted in the 2001 Major League Baseball Draft.

2002

Roster

Schedule

Tigers in the 2002 MLB Draft
The following members of the Missouri Tigers baseball program were drafted in the 2002 Major League Baseball Draft.

2003

The 2003 Missouri Tigers baseball team represented the University of Missouri in the 2003 NCAA Division I baseball season. The Tigers played their home games at Taylor Stadium. The team was coached by Tim Jamieson in his 9th season at Missouri.

For the first time since 1996, the Tigers advanced to the NCAA Tournament, where they were eliminated by Mississippi State in the Starkville Regional.

Roster

Schedule

Tigers in the 2003 MLB Draft
The following members of the Missouri Tigers baseball program were drafted in the 2003 Major League Baseball Draft.

2004

The 2004 Missouri Tigers baseball team represented the University of Missouri in the 2004 NCAA Division I baseball season. The Tigers played their home games at Taylor Stadium. The team was coached by Tim Jamieson in his 10th season at Missouri.

The Tigers advanced to back-to-back NCAA Tournaments for the first time since the 1980-1981 season.

Roster

Schedule

Tigers in the 2004 MLB Draft
The following members of the Missouri Tigers baseball program were drafted in the 2004 Major League Baseball Draft.

2005

The 2005 Missouri Tigers baseball team represented the University of Missouri in the 2005 NCAA Division I baseball season. The Tigers played their home games at Taylor Stadium. The team was coached by Tim Jamieson in his 10th season at Missouri.

With a final ranking of 21st, the Tigers finished the season ranked in the Top 25 of the Baseball America poll for the first time since 1980.

Roster

Schedule

Tigers in the 2005 MLB Draft
The following members of the Missouri Tigers baseball program were drafted in the 2005 Major League Baseball Draft.

2006

The 2006 Missouri Tigers baseball team represented the University of Missouri in the 2006 NCAA Division I baseball season. The Tigers played their home games at Taylor Stadium. The team was coached by Tim Jamieson in his 12th season at Missouri.

After losing their opening game, the Tigers came back to win the Pepperdine Regional, becoming the first #4 seed ever to win a Regional. The Tigers were eliminated by Cal State Fullerton in the Fullerton Super Regional.

Roster

Schedule

Awards and honors 
Nathan Culp
All-Midwest Region
All-Big 12 First Team
2x Big 12 Pitcher of the Week (4/4 & 5/2)

Evan Frey
All-Big 12 Honorable Mention

Jacob Priday
All-Big 12 First Team 
Big 12 Player of the Week (3/14) 
Pepsi Baseball Classic All-Tournament Team

Max Scherzer
All-Midwest Region 
All-Big 12 Honorable Mention 
Big 12 Pitcher of the Week (2/28) 
Pepsi Classic All-Tournament Team

Zane Taylor
All-Big 12 Honorable Mention 
Pepsi Classic All-Tournament Team

Travis Wendte
All-Big 12 Honorable Mention

Tigers in the 2006 MLB Draft
The following members of the Missouri Tigers baseball program were drafted in the 2006 Major League Baseball Draft.

2007

The 2007 Missouri Tigers baseball team represented the University of Missouri in the 2007 NCAA Division I baseball season. The Tigers played their home games at Taylor Stadium. The team was coached by Tim Jamieson in his 13th season at Missouri.

The Tigers finished second in the Big 12 and earned a #1 seed and hosted an NCAA Regional, where the Tigers were eliminated by Louisville.

Roster

Schedule

Awards and honors 
Trevor Coleman
Freshman All-American 
Big 12 Freshman of the Year

Aaron Crow
All-Big 12 First Team

Evan Frey
All-Big 12 Second Team 
Big 12 Player of the Week (5/22)

Kyle Gibson
All-Big 12 Honorable Mention

Ryan Lollis
All-Regional Team

Kyle Mach
All-Big 12 Honorable Mention

Jacob Priday
All-Big 12 First Team 
All-Regional Team 
Big 12 Player of the Week (4/30)

Aaron Senne
All-Regional Team

Rick Zagone
All-Big 12 Honorable Mention
National Pitcher of the Week (5/9) 
Big 12 Pitcher of the Week (5/9)

Tigers in the 2007 MLB Draft
The following members of the Missouri Tigers baseball program were drafted in the 2007 Major League Baseball Draft.

2008

The 2008 Missouri Tigers baseball team represented the University of Missouri in the 2008 NCAA Division I baseball season. The Tigers played their home games at Taylor Stadium. The team was coached by Tim Jamieson in his 13th season at Missouri.

The Tigers reached the NCAA Tournament for the sixth straight season, where the Tigers were eliminated by Ole Miss in the Coral Gables Regional.

Roster

Schedule

Tigers in the 2008 MLB Draft
The following members of the Missouri Tigers baseball program were drafted in the 2008 Major League Baseball Draft.

2009

The 2009 Missouri Tigers baseball team represented the University of Missouri in the 2009 NCAA Division I baseball season. The Tigers played their home games at Taylor Stadium. The team was coached by Tim Jamieson in his 15th season at Missouri.

The Tigers reached the NCAA Tournament for the seventh straight season, where the Tigers were eliminated by Western Kentucky in the Oxford Regional.

Roster

KS]]}}

Schedule

Tigers in the 2009 MLB Draft
The following members of the Missouri Tigers baseball program were drafted in the 2009 Major League Baseball Draft.

References

Missouri Tigers baseball seasons